39 Leonis is the Flamsteed designation for a star in the zodiac constellation of Leo. It has an apparent visual magnitude of 5.90, so, according to the Bortle scale, it is faintly visible from suburban skies at night.

The stellar classification of 39 Leonis is F6 V, indicating it is a main sequence star. It shines with a luminosity more than double that of the Sun, although it has nearly the same mass and size. This is a mature star with an estimated age of 6.3 billion years. The abundance of elements other than hydrogen and helium is about half that in the Sun, making this a metal-poor star. The effective temperature of the stellar atmosphere is 6,118 K, giving it the yellow-white hued glow of an F-type star.

Observations made with the Akari satellite at a wavelength of 18 μm show an excess of infrared emission. This suggests the presence of an inner debris disk orbiting the star at a distance greater than four astronomical units (AU). There was no significant excess found at 22 μm.

A companion star is located at an angular separation of 7.72″ along a position angle of 302.7°—this corresponds to a projected separation of 175 AU. It is a red dwarf star with a classification of M1 and an apparent visual magnitude of 11.40.

References

F-type main-sequence stars
Binary stars
Leo (constellation)
4039
Durchmusterung objects
Leonis, 39
0387
089125
050384